Crowther House is a historic home located at Westhampton Beach in Suffolk County, New York. It is a large, two-story wood-frame house in the Shingle Style and built in 1910. It features a gambrel roof with long shed dormers.  Also on the property is a detached garage.

It was added to the National Register of Historic Places in 1985.

References

Houses on the National Register of Historic Places in New York (state)
Houses completed in 1910
Shingle Style houses
Houses in Suffolk County, New York
National Register of Historic Places in Suffolk County, New York
Shingle Style architecture in New York (state)